This article covers the whole of Ireland, that is, covering both the Republic of Ireland and Northern Ireland

Navigable canals

Ardnacrusha Canal
Grand Canal
Jamestown Canal
Lecarrow Canal
Newry Ship Canal
Royal Canal
Shannon–Erne Waterway
Tralee Ship Canal

Derelict canals
Athlone Canal
Ballinasloe Canal
Boyne Navigation
Bridgetown Canal 
Broharris Canal 
Coalisland Canal (Tyrone Navigation) 
Cong Canal (Dry Canal)
Dukart's Canal 
Eglinton Canal
Lacy's Canal
Lismore Canal
Kilkenny Canal
Killaloe Canal & Plassey–Errina Canal
Lagan Canal (Lagan Navigation)
Newry Canal
Park Canal
Strabane Canal
Ulster Canal

See also

Navigable rivers
Barrow Navigation
Lower Bann Navigation
River Foyle
River Lagan
Lee Navigation
Munster Blackwater & Bride Navigation
Shannon Navigation
Slaney Navigation
Suck Navigation
Suir Navigation
Rivers of Ireland
List of rivers of Ireland

External links
 Eglington Canal - Galway City (River Corrib) 
 Waterways of Galway 

 
 
Ireland
Canals
Canals
Canals